Peter Charles Bonest Phillips (born 23 March 1948) is an econometrician. Since 1979 he has been Professor of Economics and Statistics at Yale University. He also holds positions at the University of Auckland, Singapore Management University and the University of Southampton. He is currently the co-director of Center for Financial Econometrics of Sim Kee Boon Institute for Financial Economics at Singapore Management University and is an adjunct professor of econometrics at the University of Southampton.

He is a founding editor of the journal Econometric Theory. Peter Phillips has published many theoretical articles and advanced many research areas in econometrics. He has published important articles on continuous time econometrics, finite-sample theory, asymptotic expansions, unit root and cointegration, long-range dependent time series, and panel data econometrics. He also introduced the use of the functional central limit theorem to derive asymptotic distributions of unit roots tests. Phillips mainly used frequentist statistical methods.  Phillips has also supervised numerous Ph.D. students, including Steve Durlauf. In 1993 he was elected as a Fellow of the American Statistical Association.
According to the November 2015 ranking of economists by Research Papers in Economics, he is the 5th most influential economist.

During his schooling, Phillips was the dux of Mount Albert Grammar School in New Zealand. He received a B.A. and M.A. from the University of Auckland and won prizes in both mathematics and economics. He received his PhD from London School of Economics under the supervision of John Denis Sargan in 1974.

Festschrift
In 2012, The Journal of Econometrics dedicated two Festschrifts to Phillips under the title Recent Advances in Nonstationary Time Series: A Festschrift in honor of Peter C.B. Phillips.

Selected publications

References

External links
 
 Homepage

1948 births
Living people
New Zealand economists
Time series econometricians
Yale University faculty
Academic staff of the University of Auckland
Yale Sterling Professors
People educated at Mount Albert Grammar School
Fellows of the Econometric Society
Fellows of the American Statistical Association
Fellows of the American Academy of Arts and Sciences
Corresponding Fellows of the British Academy